Old Tin Sorrows is a fantasy novel by American writer Glen Cook, the fourth novel in his ongoing Garrett P.I. series.  The series combines elements of mystery and fantasy as it follows the adventures of private investigator Garrett.

Plot introduction
Garrett is a hardboiled detective living in the city of TunFaire, a melting pot of different races, cultures, religions, and species.  When people have problems, they often come to Garrett for help, but trouble has a way of finding Garrett on its own, whether he likes it or not.

Plot summary

This Garrett novel is a traditional whodunit.  Garrett is approached by his old Imperial Marine sergeant, Blake Peters, who calls in an old war debt to get Garrett to investigate the mysterious illness afflicting his current employer, the aged General Stantnor.  Garrett moves into the Stantnor mansion, to find that only a handful of people still inhabit the property and keep it from crumbling into ruin.  As Garrett begins his investigation, an unknown individual begins murdering the few remaining members of the household.  When some of the victims come back from the dead and attack the living house guests, Garrett calls upon his good friend Morley Dotes for backup. As the focus of Garrett's investigation switches to solving the ongoing murders, he continues to be distracted by two elusive beauties seen around the house: one is the general's daughter Jennifer, but the other can only be seen fleetingly by Garrett, who suspects that she may in fact be a ghost.

While Garrett escapes various murder attempts on his own life, other members of the household are not so lucky, and the list of potential suspects grows shorter and shorter.  Morley, meanwhile, suspects the general's illness is not a result of poison, but possibly from a supernatural source.  As the pieces start to come together, Garrett and Morley hire an exorcist by the name of Doctor Doom, and with the remaining house staff gathered, they confront the sick general in his quarters.  It is revealed that the general murdered his wife, Eleanor, and the ghost that Garrett has glimpsed is in fact her.  Eleanor's ghost, as revenge for her murder, has slowly been stealing the life away from the old general.  Additionally, Garrett and company deduce that all the murders were in fact committed by the general's daughter, Jennifer, in an attempt to keep the family estate intact after her father's death; she has lived there all her life and dreads having to leave it. In the aftermath, both the general and Jennifer die, and Garrett takes as his only payment a haunting, likely magic-touched painting of Eleanor fleeing an unseen horror, as he has half fallen in love with her, and vice versa.

Characters  
Garrett
The Dead Man
Morley Dotes
Blake Peters
General Stantnor
Jennifer Stantnor
Eleanor Stantnor
Dellwood
Cook
Doctor Doom

Garrett P.I.
1989 American novels
American fantasy novels